Coterra Energy Inc. is a company engaged in hydrocarbon exploration organized in Delaware and based in Houston, Texas. The company has operations in the Permian Basin, Marcellus Shale, and the Anadarko Basin.

As of December 31, 2021, the company had  of estimated proved reserves, of which 85% was natural gas, 7% was petroleum, and 8% was natural gas liquids.

History
The company was formed as Cabot Oil & Gas Corporation, a subsidiary of Cabot Corporation. It became a public company via an initial public offering in February 1990. In March 1991, the company became 100% publicly owned.

In 1994, the company acquired Washington Energy Resources in a $180 million stock transaction.

In May 1995, the company ousted John Lollar, its chairman and CEO, in part due to the ill-timing of the acquisition of Washington Energy Resources.

In 1997, the company sold oil reserves and land in northwest Pennsylvania for $92.5 million.

In 2001, the company acquired Cody Energy for $230 million.

In June 2008, the company was added to the S&P 500.

In 2013, the company sold its assets in the Marmaton play of Oklahoma and West Texas for $160 million.

In March 2018, the company sold its assets in the Eagle Ford Group  to KKR and Venado Oil & Gas.

In October 2021, the company acquired Cimarex Energy and was renamed Coterra Energy.

Controversies

Environmental damage
In 2009, the company was cited for violations in regard to spills of toxic hydraulic fracturing fluids in Northeastern Pennsylvania.

In 2012, the company was cited for improper well construction that had resulted in polluted drinking water.

Restraining order on anti-fracking activist
In January 2014, the company sought, and a judge granted, a temporary injunction barring anti-fracking activist Vera Scroggins from entering on any of the 312.5 square miles of land in Pennsylvania owned or leased by the company. The company acknowledged that Scroggins had not violated any laws, but the lawsuit was due to her being a "nuisance" at company sites. In March 2014, the judge narrowed the injunction to prevent Scroggins only from going within 100 feet of an active well pad and 25 feet of an inactive well pad, access road or access road entrance.

References

External links
 

1989 establishments in Texas
Companies based in Houston
Companies listed on the New York Stock Exchange
Natural gas companies of the United States
Non-renewable resource companies established in 1989